The 1888 Grand National was the 50th renewal of the Grand National horse race that took place at Aintree near Liverpool, England, on 23 March 1888.

Finishing Order

Non-finishers

References

 1888
Grand National
Grand National
19th century in Lancashire
March 1888 sports events